The sack of Granada occurred in 1563 when Dragut landed in the province of Granada, Spain, and sacked or captured some coastal settlements.

Dragut had a reputation for his activity in the Mediterranean, plundering and destroying countless cities before enslaving the inhabitants such as in Cullera or in Vieste where all or almost all of the remaining inhabitants were beheaded.

In 1563, Dragut landed at the shores of Granada. He proceeded to sack the city and capture Almuñécar as well as other coastal settlements. He enslaved a total of 4,000 inhabitants.

Dragut later captured 6 ships near Capri and captured Chiaia in Naples before going on to raid Oristano, Marcellino and Ercolento.

References

16th-century military history of Spain
Barbary pirates
History of Granada